Dolge Njive is a small settlement next to Lučine in the Municipality of Gorenja Vas–Poljane in the Upper Carniola region of Slovenia.

Name
The name Dolge Njive means 'long fields', referring to agricultural arrangements in the area. Dolge Njive was attested in historical sources as Dolgonibo in 1291 and Dolgeniue in 1500.

References

External links 

Dolge Njive on Geopedia

Populated places in the Municipality of Gorenja vas-Poljane